Getti (also Romanized as Gettī and Getī; also known as Gartī, Gatī, and Kartī) is a village in Piveshk Rural District, Lirdaf District, Jask County, Hormozgan Province, Iran. At the 2006 census, its population was 402, in 100 families.

References 

Populated places in Jask County